Józef Wybieralski (born 9 March 1946 in Poznań) is a Polish former field hockey player who competed in the 1972 Summer Olympics.

He is a brother of Jerzy Wybieralski; father of Krzysztof Wybieralski; father of Łukasz Wybieralski.

References

External links
 

1946 births
Living people
Polish male field hockey players
Olympic field hockey players of Poland
Field hockey players at the 1972 Summer Olympics
Sportspeople from Poznań